The 2022 AFL Women's Grand Final was an Australian rules football match held at the Adelaide Oval on 9 April to determine the premiers of the sixth season of the AFL Women's (AFLW) league. 

The match was contested by the Adelaide Football Club and the Melbourne Football Club. It was the first meeting between the two teams in a grand final; Adelaide had won two previous premierships and made their fourth grand final appearance, while Melbourne sought to claim an inaugural senior women's premiership at their first attempt. Adelaide won the match by 13 points, claiming their third premiership. Anne Hatchard of Adelaide was awarded the best on ground medal, with 26 possessions, nine marks and six tackles.

Qualification
, nicknamed as the Crows, finished the 10-game regular season in first position with nine wins and one loss, and the competition's highest percentage, 216.6%. Their only loss came in round six against the Western Bulldogs by 1 point at Norwood Oval, who finished outside the top six and did not qualify for the finals series.  Their record earnt them their second minor premiership and a home preliminary final against  in the first weekend of April, who had defeated  by 38 points in the first qualifying final. The Crows led all match and kept Fremantle at bay after taking a 7-point lead into quarter time. The season's leading goalkicker Ashleigh Woodland booted two goals to assist in the 14-point winners victory, which resulted in Adelaide qualifying for their third successive grand final. Adelaide had faced  in round four of the regular season, and came away with a 14-point victory at Norwood Oval.

Melbourne also lost only one match throughout the regular season and claimed nine wins. Their percentage of 186.5% saw them finish in second position and, like Adelaide, they had a bye in the first week of the finals and hosted the winner of the second qualifying final. Melbourne, who usually play home matches at the 9,000 capacity Casey Fields oval in Cranbourne, had their home preliminary final moved to the 100,000-seat Melbourne Cricket Ground, which was the first time the Australian Football League's largest venue had hosted an AFL Women's match. In overcast and slightly rainy conditions, the match started as a low-scoring contested contest, with both sides scoring one goal each to half time and Melbourne holding a one-point margin. The Demons made their charge in the third quarter, kicking three goals to one before fighting off a late comeback from Brisbane to claim a four-point victory and qualify for their maiden grand final. The attendance of 6,436 was described by Guardian Australia journalist Nicole Hayes as "meagre" but partially attributable to the AFL's decision to play the match at the venue at late notice.

The grand final had originally been scheduled for Saturday, 2 April, however a COVID-19 outbreak within the Collingwood playing group days prior to the qualifying final against Brisbane meant the league pushed back that match and all subsequent matches by one week.

Venue
As Adelaide were the highest-placed team to qualify for the match, they were granted the home state advantage, and the AFL selected the 53,500 capacity Adelaide Oval, which had hosted grand finals in 2019 and 2021, as the venue for the match. 

Tickets for the match were priced at $10 for general public adults, with free entry for children under 18 years of age and free tickets given to AFLW club members and several community football and talent pathway participants. Match day weather was hot, fine and sunny. The game commenced at 12:00pm Australian Central Standard Time.

Broadcast and entertainment
The match was broadcast by the Seven Network and simulcast on Foxtel, Kayo, the afl.com.au and womens.afl websites, and on the AFL and AFLW apps. It was also available on radio nationally via ABC Radio, Triple M and SEN.

Pop artist and former Australian Idol contestant Jessica Mauboy performed for half-time entertainment, which was sponsored by Telstra. The match itself was sponsored by the National Australia Bank. Chloe Bremner sang the national anthem, supported by the Australian Girls Choir.

The grand final sprint, a tradition in the men's match since 1979 and first held for the women in 2021, was staged along the 50 metre arc. Fourteen players, one from each club, were split into two heats, with the final held at quarter time. The race was won by Alana Porter of Collingwood.

Teams
The two teams were announced on 8 April 2022. Adelaide made three changes for the match, with part-time defender Madison Newman and midfield utility Brooke Tonon dropped from the side that had won the preliminary final. Ruck Montana McKinnon was handed a one-match suspension by the AFL Tribunal for a late and high bump on Kiara Bowers of Fremantle in the team's preliminary final win. Eloise Jones and Najwa Allen returned to the side having served their own suspensions, while Jasmyn Hewett was brought in to cover for McKinnon. Melbourne's line-up was unchanged.

The three field umpires for the match were Andrew Adair, Nicholas McGinness and Jordyn Pearson. This was McGinness' third grand final and Adair's second, while Peterson made her grand final debut and became the league's second female field umpire to officiate a grand final. Boundary umpires were Ty Duncan, Simon Blight, Patrick Jackson and Luke Graves and goal umpires were Matthew Edwards and James Rizio.

Source:

Match summary
The match commenced with Adelaide's key midfielders Erin Phillips, Anne Hatchard and Ebony Marinoff starting in the centre square. Melbourne midfield included Karen Paxman and Lily Mithen, with Lauren Pearce in the ruck. Adelaide's Marijana Rajcic tagged Melbourne star Daisy Pearce, while Melbourne's Tyla Hanks tagged Erin Phillips. Adelaide captain Chelsea Randall and defender Sarah Allan shared the task of keeping Melbourne's full forward Tayla Harris quiet. Harris became the first woman to play in three grand finals playing for three different teams; all of them against Adelaide.

Adelaide had a good defensive zone set up, denying Melbourne its usual tactic of attacking down the middle, and most of the action in the first quarter was in Adelaide's forward half. The first score of the match was a rushed behind, thanks to Melbourne's Gabrielle Colvin, who saved an otherwise certain Adelaide goal. A few minutes later, Adelaide star forward Ashleigh Woodland was unable to score, fumbling the ball in the goal square. Adelaide's Danielle Ponter then attempted a tough shot from the left forward pocket, which missed but was marked on the line by late inclusion ruck Jasmyn Hewett, who went on to score Adelaide's first goal.

In the second quarter, Melbourne suffered the first injury of the day when Maddison Gay limped from the ground. She returned later in the quarter with her knee taped. Adelaide continued its attacks, but Melbourne's defensive pressure, and Adelaide's inaccurate kicking, resulted in four more behinds. A second goal for Adelaide came from a snap kick from Phillips. It was her 50th goal in the AFLW. Nonetheless, after a rushed behind to Melbourne, Adelaide was only ten points up, and a goal from Alyssa Bannan, who intercepted the ball from a kick out and raced towards an open goal gave the Demons hope.

The third quarter opened with Ponter taking a strong mark in the goal square off a long-range kick from Woodland, from which she then scored a goal. The Demons ratcheted up the pressure, and finally started to use the centre corridor. Pearce reinforced the back line, and Tayla Harris was moved into the ruck. Melbourne's Kate Hore kicked a goal after marking a long-range shot from Harris. The Adelaide defence stood firm, with Randall taking a spectacular mark. Hatchard was dominant in the midfield, and her teammates Ebony Marinoff, Teah Charlton and Rachelle Martin were active. After scoring another behind, Melbourne was nine points down at three quarter time in a match in which Adelaide had been dominant all afternoon.

Early in the final quarter, Melbourne's Casey Sherriff went off the ground with a suspected broken arm using her guernsey as a makeshift sling. With eleven minutes to go, Melbourne's Sarah Lampard took a snap at goal from 35 metres out, but missed, cutting Adelaide's lead to eight points. A pivotal moment then occurred from a Chelsea Biddell kick in from defence. Hatchard and Eloise Jones won the ball, and Jones took off, kicking it to Charlton who was forward of the centre square. Charlton kicked the ball to Ponter, who went to the ground with defender Gabrielle Colvin. Ponter immediately got back on her feet, ran forwards and kicked a goal. This was Ponter's tenth goal in a final, more than any other AFLW player, and fifth from the three grand finals she has played.

The final siren sounded, with Adelaide winning by thirteen points. Seven Adelaide players had won three premierships, in 2017, 2019 and 2022: Sarah Allan, Anne Hatchard, Ebony Marinoff, Justine Mules, Erin Phillips, Chelsea Randall and Stevie-Lee Thompson.

Best on Ground medal 

Adelaide midfielder Anne Hatchard was awarded the medal for the best player on the ground. She finished with 25 disposals, nine marks, six tackles, five clearances and 568 metres gained.

Scorecard

See also

 AFL Women's Grand Final
 2022 AFL Grand Final

References

External links
 Official AFL Women's website
 Match Program

Grand Final
AFL Women's Grand Final 2022
AFL Women's Grand Finals
Adelaide Football Club
Sport in Adelaide
Australian rules football in South Australia